The 1935 Duquesne Dukes football team was an American football team that represented Duquesne University as an independent during the 1935 college football season. In its first and only season under head coach Christie Flanagan, Duquesne compiled a 6–3 record and outscored opponents by a total of 99 to 63. The team played its home games at Forbes Field in Pittsburgh.

Schedule

References

Duquesne
Duquesne Dukes football seasons
Duquesne Dukes football